The tertiary sector of the economy, generally known as the service sector, is the third of the three economic sectors in the three-sector model (also known as the economic cycle). The others are the primary sector (raw materials) and the secondary sector (manufacturing).

The tertiary sector consists of the provision of services instead of end products.  Services (also known as "intangible goods") include attention, advice, access, experience and affective labor. The production of information has been long regarded as a service, but some economists now attribute it to a fourth sector, called the quaternary sector.

The tertiary sector involves the provision of services to other businesses as well as to final consumers. Services may involve the transport, distribution and sale of goods from a producer to a consumer, as may happen in wholesaling and retailing, pest control or entertainment. The goods may be transformed in the process of providing the service, as happens in the restaurant industry. However, the focus is on people by interacting with them and serving the customers rather than transforming the physical goods.

Difficulty of definition 
It is sometimes hard to determine whether a given company is part of the secondary or the tertiary sector. It is not only companies that have been classified as part of a sector in some schemes, since governments and their services (such as the police or military), as well as nonprofit organizations (such as charities or research associations), can also be seen as part of that sector.

In order to classify a business as a service, one can use classification systems such as the United Nations' International Standard Industrial Classification standard, the United States' Standard Industrial Classification (SIC) code system and its new replacement, the North American Industrial Classification System (NAICS), the Statistical Classification of Economic Activities in the European Community (NACE) in the EU and similar systems elsewhere. These governmental classification systems have a first-level of hierarchy that reflects whether the economic goods are tangible or intangible.

For purposes of finance and market research, market-based classification systems such as the Global Industry Classification Standard and the Industry Classification Benchmark are used to classify businesses that participate in the service sector. Unlike governmental classification systems, the first level of market-based classification systems divides the economy into functionally related markets or industries. The second or third level of these hierarchies then reflects whether goods or services are produced.

Theory of progression 
For the last 100 years, there has been a substantial shift from the primary and secondary sectors to the tertiary sector in industrialized countries. This shift is called tertiarisation. The tertiary sector is now the largest sector of the economy in the Western world, and is also the fastest-growing sector.
In examining the growth of the service sector in the early nineties, the globalist Kenichi Ohmae noted that:

Economies tend to follow a developmental progression that takes them from heavy reliance on agriculture and mining, toward the development of manufacturing (e.g. automobiles, textiles, shipbuilding, steel) and finally toward a more service-based structure. The first economy to follow this path in the modern world was the United Kingdom. The speed at which other economies have made the transition to service-based (or "post-industrial") economies has increased over time.

Historically, manufacturing tended to be more open to international trade and competition than services. However, with dramatic cost reduction and speed and reliability improvements in the transportation of people and the communication of information, the service sector now includes some of the most intensive international competition, despite residual protectionism.

Issues for service providers 

Service providers face obstacles selling services that goods-sellers rarely face.  Services are intangible, making it difficult for potential customers to understand what they will receive and what value it will hold for them. Indeed, some, such as consultants and providers of investment services, offer no guarantees of the value for price paid.

Since the quality of most services depends largely on the quality of the individuals providing the services, "people costs" are usually a high fraction of service costs.  Whereas a manufacturer may use technology, simplification, and other techniques to lower the cost of goods sold, the service provider often faces an unrelenting pattern of increasing costs.

Product differentiation is often difficult. For example, how does one choose one investment adviser over another, since they are often seen to provide identical services? Charging a premium for services is usually an option only for the most established firms, who charge extra based upon brand recognition.

Examples of tertiary sector industries 

Examples of tertiary industries may include:

 Telecommunication
 Hospitality industry/tourism 
 Mass media
 Healthcare/hospitals
 Public health
 Pharmacy
 Information technology
 Waste disposal
 Consulting
 Gambling
 Retail sales
 Fast-moving consumer goods (FMCG)
 Franchising
 Real estate
 Education
 Financial services
 Banking
 Insurance
 Investment management
 Professional services
 Legal services
 Management consulting
 Transportation

List of countries by tertiary output

Below is a list of countries by service output at market exchange rates in 2016:

See also

 Economic sector
 Indigo Era
 Post-industrial society
 Quaternary sector of the economy
 Voluntary sector

References

External links

+3
 
+3

de:Wirtschaftssektor#Terti.C3.A4rsektor_.28Dienstleistungssektor.29